The yellow-brown wrasse (Thalassoma lutescens) is a species of wrasse native to the Indian and Pacific Oceans, where they are found from Sri Lanka to the Hawaiian Islands and from southern Japan to Australia. It can reach  in total length. This species is of minor importance to local commercial fisheries and can also be found in the aquarium trade.

References

External links
 

Yellow-brown wrasse
Fish of Hawaii
Fish described in 1839